Palma Nova (Balearic ; "New Palma") is a town on the Spanish Balearic island of Mallorca, in the municipality of Calvià.
  
Palma Nova was one of the first purpose-built tourist destinations on the island, catering for all tastes. The town is frequented by a range of socio-economic groups due to the proximity with both the city of Palma and the resort of Magaluf.  With the advent of low cost airlines and package holidays, Palma Nova has grown to become a major holiday destination for Europeans.

See also
 Palmanova beach

Bibliography

External links

 Palma Nova Resort Guide
 Palma Nova Tourist Information
 Palma Nova - cool afternoon on the beach Video Impressions

Populated places in Calvià
Populated coastal places in Spain
Seaside resorts in Spain